The 2022 Prospect League season is the 13th season of collegiate summer baseball in the Prospect League, a collegiate summer baseball league in the Midwestern United States, since its creation in June 2009. There are 16 Prospect League teams, split evenly between Eastern and Western Conferences. These conferences are then split up between the Ohio River Valley, Wabash River, Great River, and Prairie Land divisions.

The Cape Catfish entered the season as defending champions, having defeated the Lafayette Aviators, two games to one, in the league's 2021 championship series.

Season schedule
Very little changed for the 2022 season, with the only difference in the team lineup being an ownership and name change for the Springfield, Ill. franchise as the Sliders became the Lucky Horseshoes. A new franchise for Jackson, Tennessee, was announced, which will take the field beginning with the 2023 season at the former home of the class Double-A Jackson Generals, The Ballpark at Jackson.

The 16 teams in the league are split evenly between two conferences Eastern and Western. These two conferences are then split up into four divisions, Ohio River Valley, Wabash River, Great River, and Prairie Land.

The season will be played with a 60-game schedule, which is split between two halves, with the first-half ending on July 4 and second-half ending on August 6. The first-half winners in each division will host the second-half winners in a one-game divisional championship round. (If the same team wins both halves, the team with the next-best second-half record makes the playoffs).

Regular season standings

First half standings

Eastern Conference

Western Conference

Second half standings

Eastern Conference

Western Conference

Full season standings

Eastern Conference

Western Conference

 y – Clinched division
 x – Clinched playoff spot

Statistical leaders

Hitting

Pitching

Awards

End of year awards 
TBD

Playoffs

Format 
The Divisional Championship Round consists of one winner-take-all game between the winner of the first half in each division and the division's second-half winner (If the same team wins both halves, the team with the next-best second-half record makes the playoffs). Division Championship games will take place August 7.

The winners of the divisional games advance to the Conference Championship Round. Again, this is a one-game, winner-take-all game between the two winners of the division championship games in the Eastern Conference and the two-division championship game-winners in the Western Conference. These games will take place August 9.

The Eastern and Western Conference champions play each other in the best-of-three Prospect League Championship Series. Game one is August 11, hosted by the team with the lesser regular-season record. After a travel day, game two is August 13. If necessary, game three will take place August 14, at the same stadium as game two. The team with the best overall record gets to pick to either host game one or games two and three.

Playoff bracket

See also
2022 NCAA Division I baseball season
2022 NCAA Division I baseball tournament
2022 College World Series
2022 NCAA Division III baseball tournament

References

Prospect League season